Madison School District #321 (MSD 321) is a school district headquartered in Rexburg, Idaho.

The district has five board members.

Schools
 Secondary
 Madison High School
 Central Alternative High School
 Madison Junior High School

 Primary
 Madison Middle School
 Elementary:
 Adams Elementary School
 Burton Elementary School
 Hibbard Elementary School
 Kennedy Elementary School
 Lincoln Elementary School
 South Fork Elementary School

Former:
 Burton-Hibbard Elementary School
 Lyman Elementary School

References

External links
 Madison School District 321
 

School districts in Idaho
Education in Madison County, Idaho